NOH or NOH may refer to:

Noh, a Japanese musical drama
Noh, Burkina Faso, a town in Burkina Faso
Nōhime, wife of Oda Nobunaga
New Oriental Hotel, former name of Amangalla, a franchise hotel in Galle, Sri Lanka
New Orleans Hornets, former name of the New Orleans Pelicans, an American basketball team
Nitroxyl, a chemical compound
 A spelling variant of surname Roh (name)
Noh, Ngari Prefecture, village in Tibet

See also 
 Nô (disambiguation)
 NOU (disambiguation)